Saving My Hubby (lit. "Be Brave, Geum-soon!") is a 2002 South Korean film starring Bae Doona, and is the directorial debut of Hyun Nam-seop.

Plot 
Due to an unplanned pregnancy, twenty-something former volleyball star Geum-soon is now a married housewife with a young daughter. Her husband, Joo-tae, is starting the first day of his new job, when Geum-soon receives word that her in-laws are going to visit the following morning. While she struggles to get their house ready, Joo-tae is taken out for a drink with his new colleagues. Later that evening, Geum-soon gets a phone call from a nightclub owner who is holding her husband hostage, claiming that he has run up a huge bill and does not have the money to pay for it. Strapping her baby to her back, Geum-soon sets out to rescue her husband.

Cast 

 Bae Doona as Jeong Geum-soon
 Kim Tae-woo as Han Joo-tae
 Lee Chan-min as Song-yi
 Joo Hyun as Baek-sa
 Go Doo-shim as Geum-soon's mother
 Han Ji-hye as convenience store clerk
 Na Moon-hee
 Kim Su-hyeon
 Ahn Gil-kang
 Gi Ju-bong
 Lee Ju-sil
 Kim Kkot-bi
 Kim Kwang-sik
 Jang Yong
 Yoon Young-geol
 Yoo Seung-mok
 Heo Hyun-ho
 Kim Sun-hwa
 Choi Hak-rak
 Kim Ji-young as room salon hostess 1
 Kim Jin-goo as neighborhood grandmother
 Son Young-soon as flower-selling grandmother
 Ki Guk-seo as boss of Crown Gang
 Cha Soon-bae

References

External links 
 
 
 

2002 films
2002 drama films
2000s Korean-language films
2002 directorial debut films
South Korean drama films
2000s South Korean films